Alvaro Trinidad Antonio, also known by his nickname Bong or Ambong, (born February 19, 1952) is a Filipino politician, who was the  Governor of Cagayan from 2007 to 2016. He is a former pro-bono lawyer at the Citizen's Legal Action Office (now known as Public Assistance Office or PAO) and a former mayor of Alcala.

Biography

Education

With an aptitude for classical studies, Antonio spent his high school years at San Jacinto Seminary, where he graduated in 1968. He thereafter went to the Pontifical and Royal University of Santo Tomas in Manila, to pursue his college studies. Governor Antonio completed his baccalaureate in philosophy, with honors, in 1972.

Suprema Lex Fraternity

Realizing his calling to serve the people, Antonio proceeded to take up law, also at UST. While finishing his law degree,  Antonio became acquainted with a group of young, idealistic law students. The group called themselves the Suprema Lex Fraternity. As a young legal scholar, Antonio was mesmerized by the group's close brotherly bond, and their ideal of promoting the general welfare, through activism, legal assistance, private enterprise, and law practice. Suprema Lex Fraternity's fundamental belief that "The welfare of the People is the Supreme Law", echoed through the consciousness of the young Antonio. This principle would later on inspire Antonio to serve as a pro bono lawyer. Thence, he later on joined the fraternity, and contributed to the fulfillment of the fraternity's ideals, as one of its most successful members.

Career  

Shunning better-paying offers, Antonio started his career as a pro bono lawyer at the Citizen's Legal Action Office (later on Public Attorney's Office). His resolve to assist the less fortunate through his legal service, is one which reechoes his belief that 'those who have less in life must have more in law!' After his dedicated stint as a pro bono Lawyer, Antonio heeded the people's cry that he serve them as their local chief executive. He thus ran and won as mayor of his hometown, namely Alcala Town, in Cagayan Province.  Antonio's popularity grew, as he became an outstanding mayor dedicated to uplifting the lives of his constituents. Thus in 2007, he was elected as Governor of Cagayan Province, with the support of then Congressman Manuel Mamba and Senator Enrile. Congressman Mamba broke away with the alliance because of allegations of corruption and jueteng against Antonio. 

Antonio went on to win two more terms. 

He took a leave after 3 terms and then lost in 2019 to incumbent Governor Mamba landing only in third place.

Sources
Profile of Governor Alvaro T. Antonio in the Official Website of Cagayan
Profile of Governor Alvaro T. Antonio in the Official Website of The League of Provinces in the Philippines
COMELEC Upholds Cagayan Governor Antonio's Procalamation
Supreme Court Upholds Cagayan Governor's Victory
Cagayan Governor to Form Task Force vs Illegal Logging
Calayan Folks Elated Over Prospect of New Seaworthy Vessel
3 Dead in Cagayan; Calamity in Isabela
Biggest wind farm to rise in Cagayan

Mayors of places in Cagayan
Living people
Governors of Cagayan
1952 births
Lakas–CMD politicians
United Nationalist Alliance politicians
20th-century Filipino lawyers
People from Cagayan